The Deep Near Infrared Survey of the Southern Sky (DENIS) was a deep astronomical survey of the southern sky in the near-infrared and optical wavelengths, using an ESO 1-meter telescope at the La Silla Observatory. It operated from 1996 to 2001.

See also 
 DENIS-P J1058.7-1548
 DENIS-P J1228.2-1547
 DENIS-P J020529.0-115925
 DENIS-P J082303.1-491201 b
 DENIS-P J101807.5-285931
 DENIS J024011.0-014628,6dFGS gJ024011.1-014628
 Edinburgh-Cape Blue Object Survey

References

External links 
 DENIS—Deep Near Infrared Survey of the Southern Sky
 ESO 1-metre telescope

Astronomical catalogues
Astronomical surveys